Khekadaengoside is any one of several chemical compounds isolated from certain plants, notably Trichosanthes tricuspidata.  They can be seen as derivatives of the triterpene hydrocarbon cucurbitane, more specifically from cucurbitacins H and L.

They include:

 Khekadaengoside A from T. tricuspidata 
 Khekadaengoside B from T. tricuspidata 
 Khekadaengoside D from the fruits of T. tricuspidata 
 Khekadaengoside K from the fruits of T. tricuspidata

References 

Triterpene glycosides